People v. Bland, 28 Cal. 4th 313 (2002), is a United States criminal case interpreting attempted murder. The defendant fired multiple shots into a car with three people, killing the driver, and injuring the other two. The evidence showed he intended to kill the driver, but did not specifically intend to kill the others. The court wrote "The crime of attempt sanctions what the person intended to do but did not accomplish, not unintended and unaccomplished potential consequences." However, the court found a person could concurrently intend to kill more than just the person targeted, both the target and others in the "kill zone" of the shots, such as when a person sets off a bomb targeting a person who is surrounded by others, who would be guilty of murder of everyone killed by the blast. 

The court distinguished murder and attempted murder in that "transferred intent does not apply to attempted murder", in that if a defendant intends to kill one person but instead kills another by the act, then the defendant is guilty of murder because the intent to kill transfers. But if the defendant attempts to kill a target and fails to kill anyone in the kill zone, the intent to kill the target does not transfer to others in the kill zone as an attempted murder. 

The court further distinguishes that if a defendant intends to kill a target and also kills others in the kill zone, then they are guilty of the murder of each person killed, i.e., is guilty of multiple counts of murder. However, if the defendant by the same act fails to kill anyone, defendant is only guilty of a single count of attempted murder by the act.

References

External links

2002 in United States case law
California state case law
United States murder case law